Joseph V. Lutz (born May 30, 1948) is an American politician. He was a member of the Maryland House of Delegates, representing District 35A from 1983 to 1990.

Early life
Joseph V. Lutz was born on May 30, 1948, in Baltimore, Maryland. He attended Calvert Hall High School. Lutz graduated from Towson State University with a Bachelor of Science in 1970. He graduated from Johns Hopkins University with a Master of Science in 1979.

Career
Lutz worked in his family-owned lumber and hardware business from 1966 to 1974. He then served in the Maryland Army National Guard from 1970 to 1973 and then the U.S. Army Reserve from 1973 to 1979. Lutz was a teacher in Baltimore City Public Schools from 1970 to 1979. He then served as an account manager at Digital Equipment Corporation.

Lutz served in the Maryland House of Delegates from 1983 to 1990. He represented District 35A and was elected as a Democrat. He ran again for District 35A in the election of 1990 and 1994, but lost both times to James M. Harkins and Donald C. Fry.

Personal life
Lutz married Joyce Petr. They had two children.

References

Living people
1948 births
Politicians from Baltimore
Schoolteachers from Maryland
Towson University alumni
Johns Hopkins University alumni
Maryland National Guard personnel
United States Army reservists
Democratic Party members of the Maryland House of Delegates
20th-century American politicians